Andreas Mårtensson (born 22 December 1983) is a Swedish motorcycle racer. He won the 250cc Swedish Championship in 2006 and the Superbike Swedish Championship in 2013 and he has also competed in three 250cc World Championship races.

Career statistics

Grand Prix motorcycle racing

By season

Races by year
(key)

References

External links
 

1983 births
Living people
Swedish motorcycle racers
250cc World Championship riders
Sportspeople from Jönköping